

Men's competition

Bantamweight (– 56 kg)

Featherweight (– 60 kg)

Lightweight (– 67.5 kg)

Middleweight (– 75 kg)

Light-heavyweight (– 82.5 kg)

Middle-heavyweight (– 90 kg)

Super-heavyweight (+ 90 kg)

Medal table

References